Wee Meng Chee (born 6 May 1983), widely known by his stage name Namewee, is a Taiwan-based Malaysian hip hop recording artist, composer, filmmaker and actor. His stage name is a bilingual pun on his first name, the English term for name.

Wee gained popularity after releasing a controversial song titled "Negarakuku", a remake of the national anthem of Malaysia, "Negaraku". The word kuku resembles the word for 'penis' in Hokkien. In the weeks following the song's release, it drew criticism from Malaysian society. Despite the controversy surrounding "Negarakuku", Wee released his first, self-titled EP, Namewee (Chinese: 明志), in Malaysia on 3 September 2007. The album was completed in May and does not contain "Negarakuku".

In early 2010, he released his first film titled Nasi Lemak 2.0. Subsequently, he released Hantu Gangster and Kara King, which were released in 2012 and 2013 respectively. He also started a talk show series on YouTube, Namewee Tokok, in September 2012. He was nominated for the Best Male Vocal Mandarin award at the Golden Melody Award in 2016 and 2017. In August 2016, he was arrested by police for filming a music video, featuring performers dressed as religious leaders going about a church, a mosque and a Chinese temple, which allegedly insulted the dignity of Islam.

Namewee is a controversial figure in Malaysian Chinese music. He first gained mainstream popularity with his song "You're Not Red" (Chinese: 你不紅). In subsequent years, several other songs also gained global attention, such as "Thai Love Song" (Chinese: 泰國情哥), "High Pitch" (Chinese: 飆高音) "Stranger In The North" (Chinese: 漂向北方) and "Tokyo Bon 2020" (Japanese: 東京盆踊り2020). Currently, over 125 of his tracks (including those which have been removed from his YouTube channel)  have over 1 million views.

Wee has since been banned in Mainland China as a result of the song and music video "Fragile" (Chinese:玻璃心), a collaboration with Taiwan-based Australian singer Kimberley Chen which went viral in October 2021.

Early life 
Born and raised up in the town of Muar, Johor, Malaysia, Wee was educated in SRJK Chung Hwa 1B and Chung Hwa High School.

While in secondary school, he wrote his first 400 songs. Around the same time, Wee and a few good friends formed a band named Aunt Band (Chinese:大娘乐队) and won several competitions. He had also released several songs, along with complementary music videos on YouTube, which include Muar's Mandarin and Kawanku (Malay: My friends), the latter sparking controversy being mistook by many as a song targeting Malaysian Chinese, Malays and Singaporeans.

He majored in Mass communication as an undergraduate at Ming Chuan University in Taoyuan, Taiwan.

Other notable works
A small controversy erupted when a three-part video Teacher Hew's ABC Time (Chinese: 邱老師 ABC 時間), directed by Wee was released. In the video, a close friend of Wee, known as teacher Hew, introduces the English alphabet from an adult-oriented perspective. It soon became notorious from its heavy use of profanity as well as orgasm sounds, and the board of directors of Chung Hwa High School decided to sue Wee, as the video was filmed in the school compound, but the lawsuit was later dropped.

In July 2009, Namewee composed the theme and ending songs for the latest Singaporean film 'Where Got Ghost?' which was released on 13 August 2009.

He acted as the principal cast in "Potong Saga" and as the supporting cast in "Meter".

Namewee also made a video clip in the late of October 2009, titled Namewee fuck TNB. In the video, Namewee's house and Muar suffer a blackout at night, but the local TNB (Tenaga Nasional Berhad) branch office remains lit, while his brother is sitting for the examinations the following day, so Wee goes to TNB to look for answers, but the ensuing quarrel leads the security guards to escort him out of the facility. After that, Wee scolds TNB and tells them to 'go back to sleep'. The ending song is dedicated to attacking TNB, parodically insulting 'TNB' ('Tenaga Nasional Berhad') as "Tiu Nia Bu", foul language in Hokkien.

In May 2010, Wee made a music video Handicap Goal, featuring himself and his friends, including teacher Hew, to celebrate the 2010 FIFA World Cup by playing football with women.

On 26 August 2010, Wee made a music video titled Nah! 2010 posting on YouTube criticising a school principal in Kulai, who was reported to have made racist remarks during a school assembly on 12 August 2010. The clip contained obscene language condemning the school principal and the Education Ministry. However, Wee was asked to give a statement in Kuala Lumpur police station and also Cyberjaya Investigation Unit for two times later.

In September 2010, he published another video I Am Who I Am (Chinese: 我還是我), depicting his past experiences and determination to pursue his dream with no return despite having obstacles.

In October 2010, Namewee was officially invited to attend the world-famous Busan International Film Festival in South Korea.

Wee released his first film Nasi Lemak 2.0—which he starred in and directed—in September 2011. The movie gained major success in Malaysia, grossing over RM7 million.

In September 2011, a public service announcement video titled Undilah, encouraging Malaysian citizens to vote, was released by Pete Teo. Namewee composed part of the music and rap lyrics as well as appearing in the video, featuring various other local celebrities and politicians.

He starred in Petaling Street Warriors, which was released in December 2011.

After the success of Nasi Lemak 2.0 and Petaling Street Warriors, Namewee started off with his another directorial work, Hantu Gangster. The film was filmed in Klang and was released on 9 August 2012.

Namewee uploaded a video about Lynas,  and talked about Australian and Kangaroo in the video, on 28 February 2012.

On 25 September 2012, he officially launched an online talk show entitled Namewee Tokok, hoping through this program, the Malaysian could have a different perspective on viewing various issues and news in Malaysia as the mass media of the country was consolidated by the government.

In 2014, Namewee established RED People, a group of Internet personnel, and was also involved in composing Joyce Chu's song Malaysia Chabor.

On 22 April 2017, Namewee uploaded a song on YouTube named "18X PAPAPA" (Chinese: 18X禁歌啪啪啪), reaching more than 8 million views in 2 months and becoming the 2nd most popular song to the group of 7–12 years old students according to research. Namewee's fans commented that although the song was only for 18+, they enjoyed it and kept replaying the song.

To remember the 10th anniversary on 20 May 2017 since he started uploading his songs on YouTube, Namewee released a music video titled Muar Mandarin 2017 Official MV (Chinese: 麻坡的華語10週年紀念版), featuring various places including the Wetex, 8th avenue, etc., in his birthplace Muar, a city in Johor, Malaysia. It was an instant hit, reaching more than one million views on YouTube in one month.

In July 2020, Namewee debuted a music video of his song "Five Hundred" (五百), which is a rock song made in the style of and a tribute to Taiwanese Wu Bai (伍佰) and his band China Blue. While Wu Bai does not appear in the video, a group of impersonators portray him and the band China Blue.

In October 2021, Namewee's "Fragile" (Chinese:玻璃心), collaborated with Taiwan-based Australian singer Kimberley Chen, garnered over 10 million YouTube views in six days since upload.   The singers were banned from Mainland China as a result of the song.

Collaboration with other artists
Namewee featured one of Asia's top superstars Wang Leehom in a song titled "Stranger In The North" (Chinese: 漂向北方), which was released on YouTube on 4 March 2017. As of 30 September 2018, the video has garnered more than 135 million views, the highest that Wee has ever achieved in producing and composing the song. It describes the life of migrant workers in Beijing, and is also a reflection of his personal journey in making a name for himself in Taiwan when he started out.

On 21 October 2017, he published another music video with the same title Stranger in The North, a KTV version featuring Hong Kong singer-songwriter and actress G.E.M. It has also received widespread popularity and amassed over 25 million views by end of September 2018.

Wee also featured Japanese actress and singer Meu Ninomiya (Japanese: 二宮芽生) in a song titled "Tokyo Bon 2020" (Japanese: 東京盆踊り2020), which was released on YouTube on 19 November 2017 and has garnered more than 30 million views in less than a year. Written and composed by Namewee in collaboration with Cool Japan TV, the video combines the elements of traditional Japanese instruments, Okinawa music style and Bon dance with foreign music, describing a clueless Asian tourist wandering on the streets of Tokyo and his amusing interaction with a Japanese high school girl who speaks Japanglish.

On 17 March 2018, he published another music video with the title Rain In Ho Chi Minh featuring Vietnam singer-songwriter Hồ Quang Hiếu.

In collaboration with the Department of Information and Tourism, Taipei City Government, Wee produced a video titled Fun Taipei Funny Ads on 25 August 2018, introducing viewers to Taipei travels and featuring Amoi-Amoi, a girl group composed of ET Wang from Taiwan, and May Ng, Stella Chen and Hong ShaoQi from Malaysia.

On 23 January 2020, he released a single and music video titled China Reggaeton featuring Hong Kong actor Anthony Wong.

Detention and arrest
On 2 August 2016, it was reported that Penang police were planning to arrest him as soon as he returned from a trip abroad over a potential charge stemmed from his controversial music video Oh my God that allegedly insulted Islam. Prior to his detention, Namewee published a video on YouTube on 21 August 2016 titled Surrender, depicting himself stripping naked (with his genitals censored) to show that he has no visible or existing injuries prior to his detention.

As planned, police detained him upon his arrival at Kuala Lumpur International Airport on 21 August 2016 and remanded him in the following day after the magistrates' court granted a remand order for four days to investigate the case under Section 295 of the Penal Code for injuring or defiling a place of worship with intent to insult the religion. On 25 August 2016, Namewee was freed on bail after the magistrates' court had refused to extend his arrest in view of his suffering from stomach ulcers.

On 22 February 2018, Namewee was detained by police for a day to facilitate investigations on his music video Like a Dog, in which he and other individuals dance allegedly indecently in front of Perdana Putra, the office complex of the Prime Minister of Malaysia. Namewee released a video refuting charges made against him, principally that the dance video had been staged in front of a mosque.

On 12 March 2021, Namewee, who at that point had resided in Taipei for seven months, released a video saying he intended to return to Malaysia and predicted that he would be detained there, over a complaint stemming from racial tensions being depicted in his film Babi. On 15 March 2021, the Malay Mail reported that Namewee had been detained for two hours after passing immigration at Kuala Lumpur International Airport, and is due to surrender himself to police custody at their Bukit Aman headquarters after a seven-day quarantine.

April 2022 hacking incident 
In early April 2022, the YouTube channel which Namewee had maintained for some 13 years, and which had over 3 million subscribers was hacked, with its contents cleared and its title replaced by profanities in Russian language. He was later able to retrieve some of the content.

Discography

Album

Extended Play

Live Recording Album

Filmography

Sources:

Concert Tours 
 Namewee 4896 World Tour (2017–2019)
 Our Voices in... (2018–2019)
 Namewee Big Bird Tour (2023-?)

References

External links 
Database
 
Official
 我的名字叫明志, Wee Meng Chee's blog 
 
 Namewee website by NameWee Production, Taipei
Negarakuku
Original music video (reuploaded on Namewee's channel on December 22, 2015)
Negarakuku on YouTube  (with English subtitles, and with Malay subtitles)
 7 Edition news snippet from ntv7 on YouTube, featuring Syed Hamid Albar, Malaysia's Foreign Minister, commenting Wee's matter will not be taken lightly and an apology will not be accepted.
 7 Edition news snippet from ntv7 on YouTube, featuring a statement by Fu Ah Kiow, Malaysia's Deputy Internal Security Minister, on "negative elements" in Wee's song.

See also
 Honorific nicknames in popular music
 Music of Malaysia
 Malaysian pop

1983 births
Living people
People from Muar
Malaysian people of Chinese descent
Malaysian expatriates in Taiwan
Malaysian male actors
Malaysian film directors
Malay-language film directors
Malaysian screenwriters
Malaysian Hokkien pop singers
Malaysian Mandopop singers
Malaysian male pop singers
Malaysian hip hop singers
Malaysian male singer-songwriters
Malaysian Internet celebrities
Malaysian bloggers
Malaysian YouTubers
Malaysian activists
Video bloggers
Male bloggers
Ming Chuan University alumni
21st-century screenwriters